Jirny is a municipality and village in Prague-East District in the Central Bohemian Region of the Czech Republic. It has about 3,000 inhabitants. It lies on the D11 motorway.

Administrative parts
The village of Nové Jirny is an administrative part of Jirny.

Geography
Návesní Pond is located in the centre of the municipality.

References

Villages in Prague-East District